Recreational travel involves travel for pleasure and recreation. 

Following the introduction of rail transport (note the concept of the railway excursion), the automobile has made recreational travel more available for people worldwide. Automobiles also allow the easy hauling of trailers, travel trailers, popup campers, off-road vehicles, boats and bicycles, which fosters recreational travel.

Terminology
Merriam-Webster's Dictionary of Synonyms suggests the word "trip" as particularly appropriate with reference to relatively short journeys, especially connoting business or pleasure.

See also

 Air travel
 Boating
 Campervan
 Day-tripper
 Mode of transport
 Rail transport
 Tourism

References

Further reading

External links

How To Revive Body & Mind With Travel

Adventure travel
Tourist activities
Types of travel
Types of tourism